The 2nd Parliament of the Province of Canada was summoned in 1844, following the general elections for the Legislative Assembly in  October 1844.  It first met on November 28, 1844.  It was dissolved in December 1847. All sessions were held at Montreal, Canada East.

The Speaker of the Legislative Assembly was Allan Napier MacNab.

Canada East 

Notes:

Canada West

References 

Upper Canadian politics in the 1850s, Underhill (and others), University of Toronto Press (1967)

External links 
 Ontario's parliament buildings ; or, A century of legislation, 1792-1892 : a historical sketch
  Assemblée nationale du Québec (French)

02